The 2007 international cricket season was between April and September 2007.

Season overview

Pre-season rankings

May

India in Bangladesh

West Indies in England

Abu Dhabi Series

World Cricket League Division Three

Group stage
27–6 May June in Darwin, Australia.

Plate Championship

Championship

June

Australian in Zimbabwe
The Australian team were due to play 3 ODIs in Zimbabwe, but the tour was cancelled in mid-May by their government following John Howard's order. Howard proclaimed the tour going ahead would be an "enormous propaganda boost" to Robert Mugabe. Cricket Australia was considering the option of holding the planned matches in a neutral location, but the Zimbabwean government quickly ruled out the possibility of the matches being played outside of Zimbabwe. On 15 May, the tour was officially cancelled.

Afro-Asia Cup

Future Cup

Bangladesh in Sri Lanka

July

Pakistan in Scotland

Future Friendship Cup

Netherlands in Canada

Netherlands played a 2 ODI series in Canada, as well as a First-class match as a part of the 2007–08 ICC Intercontinental Cup.

Quadrangular Series in Ireland

India in England

August

India in Scotland

Bermuda in the Netherlands

South Africa in Zimbabwe

See also
 2007 in cricket
 International Cricket Series News

References

External links
2007 season on ESPN CricInfo

 
2007 in cricket